Ulrika Carolina Widström (24 November 1764, in Stockholm – 19 February 1841), was a Swedish poet and translator.

Early life and education
She was born to the organ manufacturer Peter Forsberg and Katarina Maria Grip. She was educated in both French and German.

Career
She debuted as a poet in the 1780s, when she aroused attention by some poems, published in the literary papers of the day. Her breakthrough came by the publication of Erotiska sånger (Erotic songs) in 1799. Her poetry was described as very affected by the Gustavian age. Her collected work was published by Carl Julius Lénström in 1840. This was a success, and was reprinted many times. The same year, she was awarded the grand gold medal of the Royal Swedish Academy.     
Widstrom was very well known and admired by her contemporaries and artists, such as Carl Gustaf af Leopold, Bengt Lidner, Thomas Thorild and Per Daniel Amadeus Atterbom.

She married Sven Widström (d. 1814), a violinist in the royal Capell, in 1790. In 1814, she moved to Mariestad, where she opened a girls' school in 1830.

In fiction
Ulrika Widström is portrayed in the novel Pottungen (Chamber Pot Child) by Anna Laestadius Larsson from 2014, where she, alongside Ulrika Pasch, Anna Maria Lenngren, Jeanna von Lantingshausen, Marianne Ehrenström and Sophie von Fersen, becomes a member in a Blue Stockings Society organized by Hedvig Elisabeth Charlotte of Holstein-Gottorp.

See also 
 Julia Nyberg

Sources
 Widström, Ulrika Carolina, i Wilhelmina Stålberg, Anteckningar om svenska qvinnor (1864-1866)
 Widström, Ulrika Karolina, i Hofberg, Svenskt biografiskt handlexikon (1906)
 Widström, Ulrika Karolina, Nordisk familjebok (1921)

Further reading
 

1764 births
1841 deaths
Writers from Stockholm
Swedish-language writers
Swedish women poets
Translators from French
Translators from German
Translators to Swedish
18th-century Swedish women writers
18th-century Swedish poets
19th-century Swedish poets
19th-century Swedish women writers
19th-century translators